Danilo Alves Rodrigues (born 15 April 1996) is a Brazilian football player.

Club career
He made his professional debut in the Segunda Liga for Penafiel on 21 December 2016 in a game against Leixões.

References

External links
 
 Danilo Alves at ZeroZero

1996 births
Living people
Brazilian footballers
Brazilian expatriate footballers
Vila Nova Futebol Clube players
Trindade Atlético Clube players
F.C. Penafiel players
Grêmio Esportivo Anápolis players
Liga Portugal 2 players
Association football midfielders
Brazilian expatriate sportspeople in Portugal
Expatriate footballers in Portugal